Aranmore may refer to:-

 Aranmore Catholic College
 Arranmore, an island in County Donegal
 Inishmore, the largest of the Aran Islands in County Galway